The Friedrich Binder GmbH & Co. KG, Founded by Friedrich Binder (1847 in Mönsheim – November 1933), is a German jewelry manufactory in Mönsheim, Baden-Württemberg and family-owned in the fourth generation.

History 
The Friedrich Binder company was founded by the chain maker, Friedrich Binder, in Mönsheim in March 1910. For more than half a century, jewellery chains were predominantly handcrafted and a variety of chains were produced as piece work for the neighboring Pforzheim jewellery industry.

References 

Companies based in Baden-Württemberg
German jewellers
Jewellery companies of Germany
German brands